The 2030s (pronounced "twenty-thirties"; shortened to the '30s) is the next decade in the Gregorian calendar that will begin on 1 January 2030, and will end on 31 December 2039.

Plans and goals
 NASA plans to execute a crewed mission to Mars between 2031 and 2035.
 Targets of the goals of the United Nations' 2030 Agenda are set to 2030.
 A number of climate-related goals from COP26 are for 2030:
 The Glasgow Climate Pact aims to "[reduce] global carbon dioxide emissions by 55 per cent by 2030 relative to the 2010 level". However, based on existing pledges the emissions in the year 2030 will be 14% higher than in 2010.
 More than 100 countries pledged to reverse deforestation.
 India plans to draw half of its energy requirement from renewable sources.
 China aims to peak  emissions before 2030.
 The 2030 Climate Target Plan of the EU aims to cut greenhouse gas emissions by at least 55% by 2030. The European Commission made proposals in July 2021 for how to achieve this goal.
 The international community, including the United Nations, World Bank, and United States, have set the goal of completely eradicating extreme poverty by 2030. Noting a significant decline in extreme poverty since 1990, the World Bank has noted that the end of extreme poverty is in sight and pledged to cut it down to at most 3% of the world's population by this time.
 The World Health Organization and UNICEF have set a goal for universal access to basic sanitation by 2030.
 The United Nations has made it a goal that Internet access and literacy will be universal by 2030.
 The World Bank has called for all countries to implement universal health care by this time.
 Saudi Vision 2030
 Egypt Vision 2030

Expected events

2030
 New petrol and diesel cars will be banned from sale in the UK.
 The 2030 FIFA World Cup will be held.

2031
 NASA plans to deorbit the International Space Station in January of this year, directing any unbroken remnants into the South Pacific Ocean.
 The 2031 Rugby World Cup will be held in the United States.

2032
 23 July–8 August: The 2032 Summer Olympics is expected to take place in Brisbane, Queensland, Australia.

2033
 The 2033 women's Rugby World Cup will be held in the United States.

2034
 The 2034 FIFA World Cup will be held.

2035
 ITER is expected to achieve full fusion in 2035.

2036
 The United States military's lease on the island of Diego Garcia, part of the British Indian Ocean Territory, will expire if it is not renewed.

2037
 The Oxford English Dictionary is expected to publish its completed revised third edition.

2038
 19 January: Any computer systems still measuring time with signed 32-bit Unix time will fail on account of the year 2038 problem.
 The 2038 FIFA World Cup will be held.

2039
 2 September: The destroyers-for-bases deal's 99-year rent-free leases to the U.S. by the U.K. will expire.

References

 
21st century
2030s decade overviews